Jambhuwantrao Bapurao Dhote (1939 – 18 February 2017) was an Indian politician. Known by his supporters as The Lion of Vidharbha & He is son-in-law of veteran Congress leader late Ramrao Adik .

Dhote left Congress soon, and founded Vidharbha Janta Congress (VJC) Party on 9 September 2002. He was elected to Maharashtra Assembly 5 times. He was elected from Yavatmal in 1962 and 1967 elections as a Forward Bloc candidate, and in 1978 as Congress member.

He was Member of Parliament from Nagpur (Lok Sabha constituency) in 1971 to 5th Lok Sabha, defeating his Congress rival. When Indira Gandhi split Congress in January 1978, he joined her Congress(I) party. He was elected for second time from Nagpur in 1980 to 7th Lok Sabha as a Congress candidate.

He died on 18 February 2017 due to a heart attack in Yavatmal. He can be remembered as the only 'mass leader' of Vidarbha to date.

References

India MPs 1971–1977
India MPs 1980–1984
Maharashtra MLAs 1962–1967
Maharashtra MLAs 1967–1972
Maharashtra MLAs 1978–1980
Marathi politicians
1939 births
2017 deaths
Lok Sabha members from Maharashtra
Candidates in the 2014 Indian general election
All India Forward Bloc politicians
Samajwadi Janata Party politicians
Jharkhand Party politicians
Indian National Congress politicians
People from Yavatmal district
Politicians from Nagpur